Daniel Bissell (December 30, 1754 – August 21, 1824) was a soldier and spy for the Continental Army during the American Revolutionary War. Bissell joined the British Army for 13 months and passed intelligence information to the Continental Army. For his efforts, Bissell was awarded the Badge of Military Merit by General George Washington.

Early life 
He was the son of Daniel and Elizabeth Bissell and was born in Windsor, Hartford County, Connecticut Colony (now East Windsor) in 1754.

Role in the American Revolution 
On April 1, 1776, signed on for the duration as a corporal in the 5th Connecticut Regiment. He became a sergeant on September 1, 1777, and ended the war with the 2nd Connecticut Regiment.

Under the direct orders of General George Washington, Bissell posed as a deserter in the city of New York from August 14, 1781, to September 29, 1782. He realized that to get the information Washington needed, he would have to join the British Army: for 13 months, he served in the British Infantry Corps led by Benedict Arnold. Bissell memorized everything he was able to find out and then made his way back to friendly lines where he was placed under arrest until Washington verified his story. Sergeant Bissell was able to furnish valuable information including detailed maps he drew of the enemy's positions. He was to become the last recipient of the Badge of Military Merit in June 1783. Washington is given credit for designing the Purple Heart, but it the design originates from Bissell, while he was at a ball with his future wife and Washington. As Bissell was dancing with his wife, he stepped on her purple dress and ripped a piece off. He took the piece of fabric and folded into a heart and told his wife to hold onto it. When Washington learned of this, it inspired the idea to make the Purple Heart. This was published in a book that follows multiple families that are documented past the 1400s, one of which includes the Bissells. The award was lost in a house fire in 1813.

After the Revolutionary War 
During the Quasi War with France, Bissell served in the US Army. He has commissioned a First Lieutenant in the 16th Infantry Regiment on March 3, 1799, and was discharged on June 15, 1800.

Bissell died in 1824 in Richmond, New York, where he is buried in Allens Hill Cemetery. His tombstone is inscribed, "In memory of Daniel Bissell, Who died August 21st, 1824, Aged 70 Years, He had the confidence of Washington and served under him."

References

External links
Intelligence in the War of Independence

 Page on the badge of military merit/the purple heart at the United States Army Center of Military History

1754 births
1824 deaths
Continental Army soldiers
People of Connecticut in the American Revolution
People from East Windsor, Connecticut
People from Richmond, New York
American spies during the American Revolution